Aliste is a comarca located in the west of the province of Zamora, Castile and León, Spain, bordering with Portugal in the west and in the south. It covers 193,883 hectares. Aliste is an area that has preserved a rich cultural and ethnological tradition through years of isolation. Aliste is perhaps the poorest zone within the province, the economy of this deeply rural comarca is based on cattle rearing. The origin of the name Aliste appears as Alesti in a 9th Century manuscript, referring to the trees (alisos) which can be seen on the banks of what is now called the Aliste River.

The Aliste comarca is one of the few areas in Western Europe having a sizeable population of wild wolves living in the Sierra de la Culebra mountain range in the northwest of the comarca.

Geography
The terrain is rolling and hilly, alternating with dry landscapes typical to neighboring regions of Portugal. It is bisected by the River Aliste, near which is abundant vegetation, oak trees, and brush. There is a national game reserve located in the Sierra de la Culebra (65,981 hectares), which has the largest population of wolves in the Iberian Peninsula.

Municipalities

Culture
This comarca has various examples of Romanic art in its churches, which can be seen in Tabara, or the clocktower of Alcañices, as well as the castle of Riomanzanas.  There are also historical sites associated with the Templars.

Cuisine
The comarca has a diverse regional cuisine, with a famous breed of local cattle known as Ternera de Aliste.  Other popular foods include pork, which is slaughtered in local ritual festivals believed to originate with the early Celtic inhabitants of the region.

Music
There are various local music traditions, often employing the bagpipe, flute, and drum, as is common throughout Zamora.  The gaita alistana, a type of traditional bagpipe, is associated with the region, and bears some resemblance to the neighboring gaita transmontana and gaita sanabresa.

On some Sundays, and for holidays and festivals of patron saints the locals perform spectacles and traditional dances, such as the jota.   el que toca el tamboril acompaña la gaita con el canto de letras adaptadas al ritmo del baile.

Fragment of a typical jota

Customs
The customs of Aliste are based on long history and legend, with the annual slaughter of livestock (matanza) being a major cultural event.

The Alistano language 
Alistano is not properly a dialect, but may be considered a variant of Leonese, with a distinct personality influenced by Galician-Portuguese, due to geographic proximity.  Gómez Moreno states that the Alistanos "may even belong to the Portuguese race, given the clues remaining in their language."

Alistano also shows the influence of Galician, as do many aspects of Alistan culture, which has at least twenty centuries of cultural intercourse with Galicia.  The future of Alistano is difficult, but it is not definitively bound for extinction.  It persists primarily amongst the elderly.  The influx of the Leonese, increased urbanization (clashing with the primarily rural culture of Aliste), mass media, and the use of Castilian as the official language and language of education, are inexorable factors influencing the decline of Alistano.

Bibliography
Costumbres comunales de Aliste, Santiago Méndez Plaza, Madrid, 1900.
Historias de la Villa de Nuez y otras de Aliste y Alba, Gabriel Guarrido Casado, 1966.
Clima de la provincia de Zamora, Garmendia.J. (1986):. Publicación I.O.A.T.O. Salamanca.
El habla de Tierra de Aliste, José María Baz, Madrid: Consejo Superior de Investigaciones Científicas, 1967

References

External links

Web de la comarca de Aliste
Rutas por la comarca de Aliste
Lajafriz - Centro de Turismo Rural en Fornillos de Aliste

Province of Zamora
Historical regions in Spain